Diane Hunter may refer to:

 Diane Hunter (model) (born 1937), American model, a Playboy Playmate of November 1954
 Diane Hunter, a fictional character in Designated Survivor (TV series)
 Diane Hunter, a fictional character in Crossroads (British TV series)
 Diane Hunter, a fictional character in Days of Our Lives
 Diane Hunter, a fictional character in The Fosters (season 5)